Nicola Zanini (born 26 March 1974) is an Italian coach and former football player.

Playing career
A youth product of Juventus, Zanini played over 10 seasons as a midfielder in the Italian Serie B and 50 games in Serie A. He retired in 2010 after a short stint with Treviso.

Coaching career
Zanini moved into coaching in January 2010 after being promoted to head coach for his playing team Treviso. He then went on a career as a youth coach, first with Real Vicenza, and later with his former team Vicenza. He then served as head coach of Vicenza on two different stints during the 2017–18 Serie C campaign, guiding them to safety after winning a relegation playoff to Santarcangelo.

On 2018, after his experience with Vicenza, he took over the reins of Serie D club Este. He left Este in 2020 for Luparense, another Serie D club from the region. He left Luparense in 2022 for fellow Serie D club Sona, but was sacked on 10 October 2022 due to negative results.

References

External links
 gazzetta.it
 Nicola Zanini at calcio.com

1974 births
Living people
Italian footballers
Atalanta B.C. players
Genoa C.F.C. players
Juventus F.C. players
S.S.C. Napoli players
U.C. Sampdoria players
Hellas Verona F.C. players
Delfino Pescara 1936 players
A.C. Monza players
Como 1907 players
L.R. Vicenza players
Treviso F.B.C. 1993 players
U.S. Triestina Calcio 1918 players
Ascoli Calcio 1898 F.C. players
Mantova 1911 players
U.S. Pistoiese 1921 players
Association football midfielders
Serie A players
Serie B players
Italian football managers
L.R. Vicenza managers
Sportspeople from Vicenza
Footballers from Veneto